Bestial Warlust was an Australian extreme metal band formed in Melbourne in 1993. They achieved underground cult status as a war metal band.

History 
The band was first formed under the name Corpse Molestation and at the time played black/death metal with five demos and one demo compilation under the name.  Their lyrical themes involved death, war and blasphemy.  The band also used pseudonyms instead of actual names to hide their identity. They were one of the pioneers of Australian black metal and extreme metal, recording two black/death metal albums in the mid-nineties before breaking up. Their style was raw and furious, taking off from the old-school black metal style found in such bands as Bathory, Sarcófago, Beherit, and Blasphemy. Many members of Bestial Warlust went on to form Deströyer 666 and participate in other Australian extreme metal acts.

In November 2019, the group announced a show at the Croxton Bandroom in Melbourne. Initially announced for 31 October 2020, it was delayed to an as-yet-to-be-announced date in March 2021, and later to 11 September that year, due to the COVID-19 pandemic, before being cancelled.

Band members

Last known line-up
 Joe Skullfucker − Electric Rhythm & Lead Guitars / Bass / Vocals
 Markus  Hellcunt − Drums (Gospel of the Horns, Vomitor, ex-Entasis, ex-Anatomy)

Former members
 Damon a.k.a. Bloodstorm - Vocals (ex-Corpse Molestation, Kutabare, Abominator, Cemetery Urn)
 Chris Corpsemolester − Bass (ex-Corpse Molestation)
 Phil (Bullet Eater) Gresik − Bass (ex-Deströyer 666, ex-Hobbs' Angel of Death, Long Voyage Back, ex-Mass Confusion)
 Keith a.k.a. K.K. Warslut − Guitar (Deströyer 666, ex-Corpse Molestation, Raven's Wing)
 Undertaker - Bass (Abominator, Cemetery Urn)

Discography
 Vengeance War Till Death (1994)
 Blood & Valour (1995)
 Promo 1993 [One track] (1993)
 Promo 1995 (1995)
 Satan's Fist (1998)
 The Blackend Vol. 1 (Black metal compilation album featuring "Satanic", From Vengeance War Till Death
 The Blackend Vol. 2 (Black metal compilation album featuring "Orgy Of Souls" From Blood & Valour 
 Headbangers Against Disco Vol. 1 (Split album with: Sabbat, Gehennah and Infernö, 1997)

References

External links
 Bestial Warlust at Encyclopaedia Metallum
 [ Bestial Warlust] at Allmusic

Blackened death metal musical groups
Musical groups established in 1993
Musical groups disestablished in 1997
Australian death metal musical groups
Australian black metal musical groups
Australian musical trios
Musical groups from Melbourne
1993 establishments in Australia